Bård Magnus Nesteng (born 14 May 1979, in Fredrikstad, Norway) is a Norwegian archer. He competed at the 2000 Summer Olympics in Sydney, the 2012 Summer Olympics in London, and the 2016 Summer Olympics in Rio de Janeiro.

References

External links
 
 

Norwegian male archers
1979 births
Living people
Archers at the 2000 Summer Olympics
Archers at the 2012 Summer Olympics
Archers at the 2016 Summer Olympics
Olympic archers of Norway
Sportspeople from Fredrikstad
Archers at the 2015 European Games
European Games competitors for Norway
21st-century Norwegian people